Adam C. Eyre-Walker,  is a British evolutionary geneticist, currently Professor of Biology (Evolution, Behaviour and Environment) in the School of Life Sciences at the University of Sussex. He is noted for making "significant contributions to our understanding of evolution at the molecular level" and pioneering the use of DNA sequence databases for extracting information about the evolution of genomes.

Early life and career

Eyre-Walker took his B.Sc. at the University of Nottingham and Ph.D. at the University of Edinburgh. His doctoral thesis, submitted in 1992, was titled Studies of Synonymous Codon Evolution in Mammals and supervised by William G. Hill. Eyre-Walker joined the University of Sussex in 1997.

Scientific research

His research focuses on molecular and genome evolution, and studies the rate, pattern and effects of genetic mutations through the statistical analysis of DNA sequences and mathematical modeling from an evolutionary perspective. According to Eyre-Walker: "One of the central mysteries of evolution is how much of it is due to adaptive evolution at the molecular level. I have devoted much of my career in one way or another to answering this question and those related to it. It seems that adaptive evolution has a major role to play in many species, but we are far from understanding the full picture."

Research on the scientific process 

In 2013, with Nina Stoletzki, Eyre-Walker published research arguing that scientists are poor at assessing one another's work: "... scientists have little ability to judge either the intrinsic merit of a paper or its likely impact....the number of citations a paper receives is an extremely error-prone measure of scientific merit.... [and] impact factor is likely to be a poor measure of merit, since it depends on subjective assessment". He concluded: "Scientists are probably the best judges of science, but they are pretty bad at it".

Two years later, Eyre-Walker and colleagues Isabelle Cook and Sam Grange researched the optimal size and structure of scientific laboratories. By analyzing data from almost 400 different laboratories, they reported that the bigger the lab, the more productive it is (measured in number of publications, impact factor of the journals in which group members publish papers, and number of citations).

Achievements and awards

Eyre-Walker won the 2002 Balfour Prize from the Genetics Society and earned the President's award from the European Society for Evolutionary Biology in 2012. He was elected a Fellow of the Royal Society in 2020.

Selected publications 
 }
 
 
 }

References

External links
 

Living people
Year of birth missing (living people)
Alumni of the University of Nottingham
Alumni of the University of Edinburgh
Fellows of the Royal Society
20th-century British biologists
21st-century British biologists
English biologists
English geneticists
British evolutionary biologists